Kąty  is a village in the administrative district of Gmina Osiek, within Staszów County, Świętokrzyskie Voivodeship, in south-central Poland.

The village has a population of  82.

Demography 
According to the 2002 Poland census, there were 80 people residing in Kąty village, of whom 51.3% were male and 48.7% were female. In the village, the population was spread out, with 18.7% under the age of 18, 31.3% from 18 to 44, 27.5% from 45 to 64, and 22.5% who were 65 years of age or older.
 Figure 1. Population pyramid of village in 2002 — by age group and sex

Former parts of village — physiographic objects 
In the years 1970 of last age, sorted and prepared out list part of names of localities for Kąty, what you can see in table 3.

References

Villages in Staszów County